Selim station is a railway station in the town of Selim, Turkey. The station is served by the Eastern Express, operated by the Turkish State Railways from İstanbul to Kars.

References

Railway stations in Kars Province
Railway stations opened in 1913
1913 establishments in the Russian Empire